The molecular formula C16H18N4O2 (molar mass: 298.34 g/mol, exact mass: 298.1430 u) may refer to:

 Piribedil
 Nialamide

Molecular formulas